Rabindranath Datta (also known as Roby Datta) was an Indian Poet and educator. He mostly wrote in English. He was born in a renowned Bengali  family on 1 October 1883 in Sankar Ghosh Lane, Calcutta. His father was Gyanendra Nath Dutt a member of the Hatkhola Dutt family.

He studied in Oxford University. He obtained BA (Tripos, 1906) and MA (1910) degrees. He was called to the Bar (Gray's Inn), 27 January 1908 and he enrolled in the Calcutta High Court in 1909. However, he did not practice law. He taught English and Comparative Philology at Calcutta University till his death in 1917. He was a very popular teacher.

He married an accomplished English woman Emily G. Atkinson in 1913. Roby Datta with his wife Emily lived in his ancestral house on Kashinath Dutt Road, Baranagore (a suburb of Calcutta (Kolkata), INDIA.

In 1909, he wrote "Echoes from East and West"

References

External links
 

Writers from Kolkata
Academic staff of the University of Calcutta
20th-century Indian educators
1883 births
1917 deaths
20th-century Indian poets
Poets from West Bengal
Expatriates of British India in the United Kingdom